McGillivray may refer to:

People
 McGillivray (surname)

Places
 McGillivray Creek (British Columbia), a creek in the Lillooet Country of British Columbia
 McGillivray, British Columbia (formerly McGillivray Falls) in the Lillooet Country of British Columbia
 McGillivray Falls, a waterfall in the Lillooet Country of British Columbia
 McGillivray Pass, a mountain pass in the Lillooet Country of British Columbia
 McGillivray Ridge, a ridge in the East Kootenay region of British Columbia
 Mount McGillivray, Alberta, a mountain in the Canadian Rockies

Other
 MacGillivray
 McGill (disambiguation)